The Band of the Guard of the Serbian Armed Forces is the official representative military band of the Guard of the Serbian Armed Forces and the Serbian Armed Forces in general. It provides musical support to the President of Serbia and the Serbian General Staff.

History 

The first military band in Serbia was founded in 1831 by decree of Prince Miloš Obrenović under the title of Knjaževsko–Serbska Banda. The chief of the band was bandmaster Josip Slezinger who was sent to Kragujevac by prince's brother Jevrem. Dressed in ornate uniforms, the bands performed during plays in the Prince's Thetare. During that period many Serbian newspapers published articles in which they compared the band with the most experienced of Europe, including the French Republican Guard Band and the Band of the Grenadier Guards. In 1899, Serbian composer, conductor, and pedagogue Stanislav Binički began collaborating with the Belgrade Military Band and at the beginning of the 20th century, he founded the Royal Guard Band on the basis of the Prince's Band, being the only professional band at that time in the country. During his time with the band, he introduced its members to a more classical repertoire with pieces such as Franz Schubert's 8th Symphony and Antonín Dvořák's Slavonic Dances.

In 1945, the band was re-founded by order of Marshal Josip Broz Tito as the Band of the Guard of the Yugoslav People's Army. It continued the tradition pioneered by partisan bands in popularizing songs and music from the National Liberation War and became a cultural institution that developed a wide artistic culture throughout the Yugoslav People's Army. The task of the band at the time was to perform protocol duties at the highest of bodies in the Socialist Federal Republic of Yugoslavia on behalf of the JNA. With the break-up of Yugoslavia, the Guard Orchestra remained within its scope of work. Protocol tasks at the highest state level, representation of the Republic of Serbia and the Serbian Armed Forces both at home and abroad have remained the band's primary responsibility.

Organization

Depending on the needs, the band was increased and decreased numerically, which also led to the change of its name. As a rule, the best musicians who played on two or more instruments formed part of the band. Due to this, the band can be organized into the following ensembles:

 Concert band
 Symphony orchestra
 Chamber orchestra
 Chamber brass, woodwind or string ensembles
 Big band/disco orchestra

Missions
Band regularly performs on arrival ceremonies of foreign state and military dignitaries, on public holidays in Serbia (Statehood Day and Armistice Day in particular), anniversary days of the Guard and the Serbian Armed Forces, as well as at the military parades. Other occasions in which the band took part include:

1984 Winter Olympics
1961 and 1989 Non-Aligned Movement summits of heads of state. 
Military tattoos
Modena International Military Tattoo (2001)
International Military Music Festival at Albertville (2002)
Linz Military Bands Festival (2010)
Bremen Tattoo (2011)
Liège Festival of Military Bands (2014 and 2018), on the centenaries of the outbreak and end of World War I

A lot of the pieces in the repertoire of the band are written by composer Stanislav Binički, who wrote common marches such as the Gardijski marš, Marš na Drinu and the Paradni marš. Unlike the rest of the armed forces, when on parade, the band does not perform the traditional high step and, before 1975, the goose step.

List of conductors 
Since its founding in 1945, the conductors of the band have been:
 Tomaž Zajc (1945-1948)
 Iso Dracula (1948-1955)
 Gvido Uchakar (1956-1963)
 Gojko Bošnjak (1963-1972)
 Mihailo Petras (1972-1973) 
 Franc Klinar (1973-1977)
 Mihailo Petras (1977-1984) 
 Ilija Ilijevski (1984-1992)

See also
 Military Band

Notes

References

Sources
 

Military bands
National symbols of Serbia
Military units and formations of Serbia
Wind bands
Military units and formations established in 1945
Musical groups established in 1945
1945 establishments in Serbia
Military units and formations established in 1831
Musical groups established in 1831
1831 establishments in Serbia